The October Surprise conspiracy theory refers to an alleged plot to influence the outcome of the 1980 United States presidential election, contested between Democratic incumbent president Jimmy Carter and his Republican opponent, former California governor Ronald Reagan.

One of the leading national issues during 1980 was the release of 66 Americans being held hostage in Iran since November 4, 1979. Reagan won the election. On the day of his inauguration—in fact, minutes after he concluded his 20-minute inaugural address—the Islamic Republic of Iran announced the release of the hostages. The timing gave rise to an allegation that representatives of Reagan's presidential campaign had conspired with Iran to delay the release until after the election to thwart President Jimmy Carter from pulling off an "October surprise".

According to the allegation, the Reagan Administration subsequently rewarded Iran for its participation in the plot by supplying Iran with weapons via Israel and by unblocking Iranian government monetary assets in U.S. banks.

After twelve years of varying media attention, both houses of the United States Congress held separate inquiries and concluded that credible evidence supporting the allegation was absent or insufficient.

Nevertheless, several individuals—most notably, former Iranian President Abulhassan Banisadr, former Lieutenant Governor of Texas Ben Barnes, former naval intelligence officer and U.S. National Security Council member Gary Sick, and Barbara Honegger, a former campaign staffer and White House analyst for Reagan and his successor, George H. W. Bush—have stood by the allegation.

Background

In November 1979, a number of U.S. hostages were captured in Iran during the Iranian Revolution. The Iran hostage crisis continued into 1980; as the November 1980 presidential election approached, there were concerns in the Republican Party that a resolution of the crisis could constitute an "October surprise" which might give incumbent Jimmy Carter enough of an electoral boost to be re-elected. After the release of the hostages on January 20, 1981, mere minutes after Republican challenger Ronald Reagan's inauguration, some charged that the Reagan campaign had made a secret deal with the Iranian government whereby the Iranians would hold the hostages until after Reagan was elected and inaugurated.

The issue of an "October Surprise" was brought up during an investigation by a House of Representatives Subcommittee into how the 1980 Reagan Campaign obtained debate briefing materials of then-President Carter. During that investigation, sometimes referred to as Debategate, the Subcommittee on Human Resources of the House Post Office and Civil Service Committee obtained access to Reagan Campaign documents. The documents included numerous references to a monitoring effort for any such October Surprise. The Subcommittee, chaired by former U.S. Rep. Donald Albosta (D–MI), issued a comprehensive report on May 17, 1984, describing each type of information that was detected and its possible source. A section of the report was dedicated to the October Surprise issue.

Origins
The first printed instance of the October Surprise conspiracy theory has been attributed to a story in the December 2, 1980, issue of Executive Intelligence Review, a periodical published by followers of Lyndon LaRouche. Written by Robert Dreyfuss, the article cited "Iranian sources" in Paris as well as "Top level intelligence sources in Reagan's inner circle" as saying that Henry Kissinger met with representatives of Mohammad Beheshti during the week of November 12, 1980. The story claimed that "pro-Reagan British intelligence circles and the Kissinger faction" meeting with the Iranians six to eight weeks prior had interfered with "President Carter's efforts to secure an arms-for-hostage deal with Teheran". The LaRouche movement returned to the story in the September 2, 1983, issue of New Solidarity, stating "The deal ... fell through when the hard-line mullahs boycotted the Majlis in late October."

The conspiracy theory garnered little attention until news of the Iran Contra affair broke in November 1986. John M. Barry of Newsweek has said that Iran-Contra "created fertile ground for the October Surprise theory". Scott D'Amico in Conspiracies and Conspiracy Theories in American History wrote that "[t]he arms-deal arrangement provided credence to those who believed Reagan was fulfilling his end of the October surprise pact with Khomeni." In the November 24, 1986, issue of The New York Times, William Safire charged: "The geopolitical excuse offered now - that the ransom was a plan to influence post-Khomeini Iran - is a feeble cover-up. Robert McFarlane first approached the Reagan campaign in the summer of 1980 with an Iranian in tow who proposed to deliver our hostages to Mr. Reagan rather than President Carter, thereby swinging the U.S. election. The Reagan representatives properly recoiled, but Mr. McFarlane has had Iranian held hostages on the brain ever since." Safire's piece was based upon information he solicited from Laurence Silberman in 1984 regarding a brief meeting four years earlier between Silberman, McFarlane, and Richard V. Allen with a Malaysian man who proposed a plan to contact someone who could influence Iran to delay the release of the hostages in order to embarrass the Carter administration. Silberman later wrote: "Ironically, it was I who unwittingly initiated the so-called 'October Surprise' story, which grew into an utterly fantastic tale". An article by Bob Woodward and Walter Pincus a few days later in the November 29, 1986 The Washington Post said that United States officials tied to Reagan, well before the Iran Contra affair, considered an initiative to sell US-made military parts to Iran in exchange for the hostage held there. The House October Surprise Task Force credited the Woodward/Pincus article as raising "claims that would become keystones in the October Surprise theory".

The Miami Herald published an article by Alfonso Chardy on April 12, 1987, that McFarlane, Silberman, and Allen had met with a man claiming to represent the Iranian government and offering the release of the hostages. Chardy's article also quoted exiled former Iranian president Abolhassan Banisadr who said he had learned that Beheshti and Akbar Hashemi Rafsanjani were involved in negotiations with the Reagan campaign to delay the release of the hostages until Reagan became president.

Chronology
The House October Surprise Task Force outlined as "principal allegations" three supposed meetings between representatives of Reagan's campaign and Iranian government officials in the summer and fall of 1980 to delay the release of the hostages: 1) a meeting in Madrid during the summer, 2) a meeting at the L'Enfant Plaza Hotel in Washington, D.C that autumn, and 3) a meeting in Paris in October. The Task Force characterized three other alleged meetings or contacts as "ancillary allegations": 1) a meeting at the Mayflower Hotel in Washington, D.C. in early spring 1980, 2) a meeting at the Churchill Hotel in London in the summer of 1980, and 3) a meeting at the Sherry Netherlands Hotel in New York in January 1981.

March 1980: Jamshid Hashemi told Gary Sick he was visited by CIA director William Casey and Roy Furmark while staying at the Mayflower Hotel in Washington, D.C. in March 1980. Hashemi claimed Casey was aware of his contacts in Iran and wanted to discuss the American hostages held there. He told Sick that he then reported the meeting to his "intelligence contact" Charles Cogan, then a senior official within the CIA's Directorate of Operations. Hashemi later testified that he was alone with Casey and denied telling Sick that Furmark was present, and that the meeting with Casey occurred in July 1980. The House October Surprise Task Force concluded that there was no credible evidence to support the allegations. The Task Force said that Hashemi was the only source of the story, that he provided no evidence to substantiate the allegations, that there were major inconsistencies in his story to different parties, and that there was credible documentary and testimonial evidence inconsistent with his allegations.
March 21, 1980: Jamshid Hashimi and his brother Cyrus Hashemi meet at the latter's home.
Spring 1980: In an October 1990 interview, Jamshid Hashemi told Gary Sick he was introduced to Donald Gregg, a U.S. National Security Council aide with connections to George Bush, at Cyrus Hashemi's office in New York City in the Spring of 1980. Jamshid told Sick that he and Cyrus had lunch with Gregg at a restaurant near Cyrus' office where they discussed the contacts that were underway between the brothers and the U.S. Government. The House October Surprise Task Force said that they found no credible evidence that Gregg met with the Hashemi's, and noted that Jamshid recanted the allegation in testimony stating he had never met with Gregg. After Jamshid's testimony denying that he told Sick that he met with Gregg, he told Sick that the person he met with was actually Robert Gray. The Task Force concluded that Jamshid Hashemi's "recent statements about this matter as totally devoid of credibility and probative of a tendency to modify his allegations to conform to subsequent revelations which are inconsistent with those allegations."
Last week of July 1980: At a meeting in Madrid arranged by the Hashimi brothers that includes Robert Gray, a man identified as Donald Gregg, and Mahdi Karrubi, an Iranian politician, William Casey says that if Iran could assure that American hostages were well treated until their release and were released as a "gift" to the new administration, "the Republicans would be most grateful and 'would give Iran its strength back.'" Karrubi says he has "no authority to make such a commitment".
 About August 12, 1980: Karrubi meets again with Casey, saying Khomeini has agreed to the proposal. Casey agrees the next day, naming Cyrus Hashimi as middleman to handle the arms transactions. More meetings are set for October. Cyrus Hashimi purchases a Greek ship and commences arms deliveries valued at $150 million from the Israeli port of Eilat to Bandar Abbas. According to CIA sources, Hashimi receives a $7 million commission. Casey is said to use an aide named Tom Carter in the negotiations.
 September 22, 1980: Iraq invades Iran.
 Late September 1980: An expatriate Iranian arms dealer named Hushang Lavi claims he met with Richard V. Allen, the Reagan campaign's national security expert, Robert "Bud" McFarlane, and Lawrence Silberman, co-chairman of Ronald Reagan's foreign policy advisors during the campaign, and discussed the possible exchange of F-4 parts for American hostages, but Lavi says they asserted they "were already in touch with the Iranians themselves".
October 15–20: Meetings are held in Paris between emissaries of the Reagan/Bush campaign, with Casey as "key participant", and "high-level Iranian and Israeli representatives".
October 21: Iran, for reasons not explained, abruptly shifts its position in secret negotiations with the Carter administration and disclaims "further interest in receiving military equipment".
October 21–23: Israel secretly ships F-4 fighter-aircraft tires to Iran, in violation of the U.S. arms embargo, and Iran disperses the hostages to different locations.
January 20, 1981: Hostages are formally released into United States custody after spending 444 days in captivity. The release takes place just minutes after Ronald Reagan is sworn in as president.

Investigations

Frontline
The investigative journalism TV series Frontline produced a 1991 documentary which "investigate[d] startling new evidence about how both the Carter and Reagan camps may have tried to forge secret deals for [the Iranian] hostages during the 1980 presidential campaign.

Gary Sick

Gary Sick wrote an editorial for The New York Times in April 1991, and a book (October Surprise: America's Hostages in Iran and the Election of Ronald Reagan), published in November 1991, on the subject. Sick's credibility was boosted by the fact that he was a retired naval captain, served on Ford's, Carter's, and Reagan's National Security Council, and held high positions with many prominent organizations; moreover, he had authored a book recently on US-Iran relations (All Fall Down). Sick wrote that in October 1980, officials in Ronald Reagan's presidential campaign, including future CIA Director William Casey, made a secret deal with Iran to delay the release of the American hostages until after the election; in return for this, the United States purportedly arranged for Israel to ship weapons to Iran.

Sick admitted that "The story is tangled and murky, and it may never be fully unraveled." He was unable to prove his claims, including that, in the days before the presidential election with daily press pools surrounding him and a public travel schedule, vice presidential candidate George H. W. Bush secretly left the country and met with Iranian officials in France to discuss the fate of the hostages.

Danny Casolaro
In August 1991, freelance writer Danny Casolaro (among others) claimed to be almost ready to expose the alleged October surprise conspiracy, when he suddenly died a violent death in a hotel bathtub in Martinsburg, West Virginia, raising suspicions. He appeared to be traveling on leads for his investigation into the Inslaw Affair. His death was ruled a suicide.

Newsweek
Newsweek magazine also ran an investigation, reporting in November 1991 that most, if not all, of the charges made were groundless. Specifically, Newsweek found little evidence that the United States had transferred arms to Iran prior to Iran Contra, and was able to account for William Casey's whereabouts when he was allegedly at the Madrid meeting, saying that he was at a conference in London. Newsweek also alleged that the story was being heavily pushed within the LaRouche Movement.

The New Republic
Steven Emerson and Jesse Furman of The New Republic also looked into the allegations and reported, in November 1991, that "the conspiracy as currently postulated is a total fabrication". They were unable to verify any of the evidence presented by Sick and supporters, finding them to be inconsistent and contradictory in nature. They also pointed out that nearly every witness of Sick's had either been indicted or was under investigation by the Department of Justice. Like the Newsweek investigation, they had also debunked the claims of Reagan election campaign officials being in Paris during the timeframe that Sick specified, contradicting Sick's sources.

The Village Voice
Retired CIA analyst and counter-intelligence officer Frank Snepp of The Village Voice reviewed Sick's allegations, publishing an article in February 1992. Snepp alleged that Sick had only interviewed half of the sources used in his book, and supposedly relied on hearsay from unreliable sources for large amounts of critical material. Snepp also discovered that Sick had sold the rights to his book to Oliver Stone in 1989. After going through evidence presented by Richard Brenneke, Snepp asserted that Brenneke's credit card receipts showed him to be in Portland, Oregon, during the time he claimed to be in Paris observing the secret meeting.

Senate investigation
The US Senate's November 1992 report concluded that "by any standard, the credible evidence now known falls far short of supporting the allegation of an agreement between the Reagan campaign and Iran to delay the release of the hostages."

House of Representatives investigation

The House of Representatives' January 1993 report concluded "there is no credible evidence supporting any attempt by the Reagan presidential campaign—or persons associated with the campaign—to delay the release of the American hostages in Iran". The task force Chairman Lee H. Hamilton also added that the vast majority of the sources and material reviewed by the committee were "wholesale fabricators or were impeached by documentary evidence". The report also expressed the belief that several witnesses had committed perjury during their sworn statements to the committee, among them Richard Brenneke, who claimed to be a CIA agent.

Allegations

Former Iranian President Banisadr

This accusation was made in Banisadr's 1989 memoir, which also claimed that Henry Kissinger plotted to set up a Palestinian state in the Iranian province of Khuzestan and that Zbigniew Brzezinski conspired with Saddam Hussein to plot Iraq's 1980 invasion of Iran. Foreign Affairs described the book as "a rambling, self-serving series of reminiscences" and "long on sensational allegations and devoid of documentation that might lend credence to Bani-Sadr's claims".

Writing again in 2013 in The Christian Science Monitor, Banisadr reiterated and elaborated on his earlier statements:

I was deposed in June 1981 as a result of a coup against me. After arriving in France, I told a BBC reporter that I had left Iran to expose the symbiotic relationship between Khomeinism and Reaganism. Ayatollah Khomeini and Ronald Reagan had organized a clandestine negotiation, later known as the "October Surprise", which prevented the attempts by myself and then-US President Jimmy Carter to free the hostages before the 1980 US presidential election took place. The fact that they were not released tipped the results of the election in favor of Reagan.

Two of my advisors, Hussein Navab Safavi and Sadr-al-Hefazi, were executed by Khomeini's regime because they had become aware of this secret relationship between Khomeini, his son Ahmad, the Islamic Republican Party, and the Reagan administration.

Barbara Honegger
Barbara Honegger was a 1980 Reagan-Bush campaign staffer and later a Reagan White House policy analyst. Since 1995, she's been Senior Military Affairs Journalist at the Naval Postgraduate School. After the 1980 election, she headed the U.S. Attorney General's Gender Discrimination Agency Review under the presidency of Ronald Reagan, before resigning from her post in 1983. While working for Reagan, she claims to have discovered information that made her believe that George H. W. Bush and William Casey had conspired to assure that Iran would not free the U.S. hostages until Jimmy Carter had been defeated in the 1980 presidential election, and she alleges that arms sales to Iran were a part of that bargain. In 1987, in the context of the Iran-Contra investigations, Honegger was reported as saying that shortly after October 22, 1980, when Iran abruptly changed the terms of its deal with Carter, a member of the Reagan campaign told her "We don't have to worry about an 'October surprise.' Dick cut a deal," with "Dick" referring to Richard V. Allen.

Kevin Phillips
Political historian Kevin Phillips has been a proponent of the idea. In his 2004 book American Dynasty, although Phillips concedes that many of the specific allegations were proven false, he also argues that in his opinion, Reagan campaign officials "probably" were involved in a scheme "akin to" the specific scheme alleged by Sick.

Chase Bank revelations
Banker Ernest Backes from Clearstream (Luxembourg) claimed he was in charge of the transfer of $7 million from Chase Manhattan Bank and Citibank, January 16, 1980, to pay for the liberation of the hostages. He gave copies of the files to the French National Assembly.

In a memoir by Joseph V. Reed Jr. it is revealed that the "team" around David Rockefeller "collaborated closely with the Reagan campaign in its efforts to pre-empt and discourage what it derisively labeled an "October surprise" — a pre-election release of the American hostages, the papers show. The Chase team helped the Reagan campaign gather and spread rumors about possible payoffs to win the release, a propaganda effort that Carter administration officials have said impeded talks to free the captives."

Duane "Dewey" Clarridge
In his final interview, former CIA operations officer and Iran-Contra figure Duane Clarridge claimed that the October Surprise had occurred as depicted in George Cave's novel, October 1980.

Declassified 1980 CIA memo 
In 2017, a declassified CIA 1980 memo was released in which the agency concluded "Iranian hardliners – especially Ayatollah Khomeini" were "determined to exploit the hostage issue to bring about President Carter’s defeat in the November elections." MuckRock, a press organization specialized in Freedom of Information Act requests, argued that "While the document doesn’t prove the Reagan campaign intended to collude with Iran, it does document Iran’s motives and matches the October Surprise narrative outlined by former CIA officers George Cave and Duane 'Dewey' Clarridge."

Ben Barnes
In March 2023, Peter Baker reported in The New York Times that former Texas governor John Connally, who had sought the Republican presidential nomination in 1980, travelled to several Arab countries and Israel between July 1980 and August 1980. According to Connally's close associate Ben Barnes, who accompanied him on the trip, Connally told the Arab officials whom he spoke with to relay a message to Iran to the effect that "Ronald Reagan's going to be elected president and you need to get the word to Iran that they're going to make a better deal with Reagan than they are Carter." Barnes also recounted accompanying Connally to a September 1980 meeting in Houston in which Connally briefed William J. Casey, Reagan's campaign manager and a central figure in many versions of the "October Surprise" conspiracy theory, on the outcome of the trip, with Casey specifically asking if "[the Iranians] were going to hold the hostages."

While there is documentation that this trip to the Middle East occurred and that Connally communicated with close Reagan associates during the trip, Baker states that there are "no diaries or memos to corroborate" Barnes's recollection of what, specifically, Connally told the Arab officials. Additionally, Barnes's account does not confirm "debunked previous theories of what happened," such as the Reagan campaign reaching an arms-for-hostages agreement with Iran prior to the outcome of the 1980 election. Barnes avoided scrutiny during the congressional "October Surprise" investigations, but his anecdote about Connally had been previously published in H. W. Brands's 2015 biography of Reagan, albeit "generat[ing] little public notice at the time" according to Baker. Barnes acknowledged not being in a position to assess personal involvement by Reagan himself or the effect (if any) that Connally's overture may have had on Iranian policy.

See also
 Iran–Contra affair
 Jimmy Carter's engagement with Ruhollah Khomeini

References

External links
 The Newsweek and New Republic articles cited above, as reprinted in the Congressional Record
 PBS Frontline reports: "Investigating the October Surprise" 1992 [Inaccessible, 6 August 2008 16:01 UTC]
 Chapter from Eighty Greatest Conspiracies of All Time
 Article from Conspiracy Theories in American History: An Encyclopedia addressing October Surprise conspiracy
 Gary Sick, Discredited but Honored by Emanuele Ottolenghi in Middle East Quarterly

October 1980 events in the United States
1980 in Iran
1980 in the United States
1980 United States presidential election
Conspiracy theories in the United States
Investigative journalism
Iran–Contra affair
Iran hostage crisis
Iran–United States relations
Carter administration controversies
Reagan administration controversies
Abolhassan Banisadr

es:Sorpresa de octubre
fr:Surprise d'octobre
it:Cospirazione della sorpresa d'ottobre